Mirza Abu Turab Akhundzade (1817, Baku, Russian Empire - 1910, Baku, Russian Empire) was an Azerbaijani theologian, publicist, educator, enlightener.

Life 
He was born in 1817 in Baku. He received his primary education in the madrasa of Mirza Hasib Qudsi, and his higher religious education in the city of Medina.

He published numerous articles on the pages of Azerbaijani newspapers and magazines, and was the author of books on the history and philosophy of religion. He was a supporter of progressive initiatives in the field of education and was closely acquainted with Haji Zeynalabdin Tagiyev. He gave his daughter to the Baku Muslim Women's School, which caused the anger and discontent of the believers. He died in 1910 and was buried in Mardakan, at the Pir Hasan Mausoleum. Zeynalabdin Tagiyev was buried nearby and, according to legend, he bequeathed to bury himself at the feet of Abuturab.

Works  
 Reasons for the division of Islam

References 

Azerbaijani-language writers
Writers from the Russian Empire
1817 births
1910 deaths
People from Baku
Azerbaijani publicists
Azerbaijani religious leaders
Azerbaijani educators
Burials in Baku